Mark Smith (born 1960) is a Canadian politician who was elected in the 2019 Alberta general election to the Legislative Assembly of Alberta representing the electoral district of Drayton Valley-Devon.

Prior to the 2019 Alberta general election, Smith came under fire for apparent homophobic comments made in a 2013 sermon. Although he could not recall or confirm making any commentary, Smith publicly apologized and stated that "our leader and our party have been clear: it doesn't matter who you love or how you worship, all are welcome in our party" (Smith).

Electoral history

2015 general election

References

Wildrose Party MLAs
Living people
21st-century Canadian politicians
1960 births
Canadian educators
United Conservative Party MLAs
Canadian clergy